Timber War is a 1935 American drama film directed by Sam Newfield from a screenplay by Jos. O'Donnell and Barry Barringer.  The film stars Kermit Maynard, Lucille Lund, and Lawrence Gray.

Cast
 Kermit Maynard as Jim Dolan
 Lucille Lund as Sally Martin
 Lawrence Gray as Larry Keene
 Robert Warwick as Ferguson
 Wheeler Oakman as Murdock
 Lloyd Ingraham as Terry O'Leary
 Roger Williams as Bowan
 Patricia Royale as Secretary
 Jim Pierce as Braden
 Horace Murphy as Charlie

References

American drama films
1935 drama films
1935 films
American black-and-white films
Films based on works by James Oliver Curwood
Films directed by Sam Newfield
Films about lumberjacks
1930s American films